There are at least 11 named mountains in Musselshell County, Montana.
 Chimney Butte, el. 
 Dunn Mountain, el. 
 Elbow Hill, el. 
 Johnston Mountain, el. 
 Kilby Butte, el. 
 Naderman Buttes, el. 
 Signal Mountain, el. 
 Square Butte, el. 
 Steamboat Rock, el. 
 Three Buttes, el. 
 Timber Buttes, el.

See also
 List of mountains in Montana
 List of mountain ranges in Montana

Notes

Landforms of Musselshell County, Montana
Musselshell